Acrossocheilus fasciatus is a species of ray-finned fish in the genus Acrossocheilus. It inhabits mountain streams of southeast China.

References

Fasciatus
Freshwater fish of China
Endemic fauna of China
Fish described in 1892